Lists of important publications in science cover publications in various fields of science that have introduced a major new topic, made a significant advance in knowledge or have significantly influenced the world.

Computer science 
 List of important publications in computer science
 List of important publications in cryptography

Mathematics 
 List of important publications in mathematics
 List of important publications in statistics

Medicine 
 List of important publications in medicine
Bibliography of evidence-based medicine

Natural sciences 
 Bibliography of biology
 List of important publications in chemistry
 List of important publications in geology
 List of important publications in physics
 List of scientific publications by Albert Einstein
 List of systems of plant taxonomy

Philosophy 
 List of important publications in philosophy

Social sciences 
 Bibliography of sociology
 List of humor research publications
 List of important publications in anthropology
 List of important publications in economics